Noble Consort Yu (15 June 1714 – 9 July 1792), of the Mongol Bordered Blue Banner Keliyete clan, was a consort of the Qianlong Emperor. She was three years his junior.

Life

Family background
Noble Consort Yu's personal name was not recorded in history.

 Father: E'erjitu, served as a fifth rank literary official

Kangxi era
The future Noble Consort Yu was born on the fourth day of the fifth lunar month in the 53rd year of the reign of the Kangxi Emperor, which translates to 15 June 1714 in the Gregorian calendar.

Yongzheng era
It is not known when Lady Keliyete became a mistress of Hongli, the fourth son of the Yongzheng Emperor.

Qianlong era
The Yongzheng Emperor died on 8 October 1735 and was succeeded by Hongli, who was enthroned as the Qianlong Emperor. On 8 November 1735, Lady Keliyete was granted the title "First Attendant Hai". In 1736, she was elevated to "Noble Lady Hai". On 23 March 1741, Lady Keliyete gave birth to the emperor's fifth son, Yongqi. She was elevated in December 1741 or January 1742 to "Concubine Yu", and on 9 December 1745 to "Consort Yu".

Yongqi was the first among the Qianlong Emperor's sons to be made a first rank prince. Following Yongqi's death on 16 April 1766, Lady Keliyete lost the Qianlong Emperor's favour. She died on 9 July 1792. In 1793, the emperor granted her the posthumous title "Noble Consort Yu" and had her interred in the Yu Mausoleum of the Eastern Qing tombs.

Titles
 During the reign of the Qianlong Emperor (r. 1735–1796):
 First Attendant Hai (from 8 November 1735), seventh rank consort
 Noble Lady Hai (from 1736), sixth rank consort
 Concubine Yu (from December 1741 or January 1742), fifth rank consort
 Consort Yu (from 9 December 1745), fourth rank consort
 Noble Consort Yu (from 23 November 1793), third rank consort

Issue
 As Noble Lady:
 Yongqi (23 March 1741 – 16 April 1766), the Qianlong Emperor's fifth son, posthumously honoured as Prince Rongchun of the First Rank

In fiction and popular culture
 Portrayed by Zhuang Qingning in New My Fair Princess (2011)
 Portrayed by Lian Lian in Story of Yanxi Palace (2018)
 Portrayed by Janine Chang in Ruyi's Royal Love in the Palace (2018)

See also
 Ranks of imperial consorts in China#Qing
 Royal and noble ranks of the Qing dynasty

Notes

References
 

1714 births
1792 deaths
Consorts of the Qianlong Emperor
18th-century Mongolian women
18th-century Chinese women
Mongolian Bordered Blue Bannermen